Frank Rooney  may refer to:

 Frank Rooney (businessman), American businessman
 Frank Rooney (baseball) (1884–1977), Austro-Hungarian Major League Baseball infielder
 Frank Rooney (novelist)